The Sodemo V2-1.0 is a French aircraft engine, designed and produced by Sodemo of Magny-Cours, for use in light aircraft.

Design and development
The engine is a 90° V-twin-cylinder four-stroke,  displacement, liquid-cooled, gasoline engine design, with a mechanical gearbox reduction drive. It employs dual capacitor discharge ignition and produces  at 6500 rpm.

Specifications (V2-1.0)

See also

References

External links

Sodemo aircraft engines
Liquid-cooled aircraft piston engines
2010s aircraft piston engines